New Derry is an unincorporated community in Westmoreland County, Pennsylvania, United States. New Derry has a post office, with ZIP code 15671, which opened on February 3, 1823.

References

Unincorporated communities in Westmoreland County, Pennsylvania
Unincorporated communities in Pennsylvania